Jhonnier Gonzalez (born July 6, 1982) is a Colombian soccer player who was member of the Colombia.

External links

Career Stats

1982 births
Living people
Colombian footballers
Envigado F.C. players
Independiente Santa Fe footballers
Club Atlético Colón footballers
Atlético Huila footballers
Independiente Medellín footballers
León de Huánuco footballers
América de Cali footballers
Colombian expatriate footballers
Categoría Primera A players
Peruvian Primera División players
Expatriate footballers in Argentina
Expatriate footballers in Peru
Association football defenders
Sportspeople from Antioquia Department